Alois De Hertog (9 August 1927 – 22 November 1993) was a Belgian racing cyclist. He won the 1953 edition of the Liège–Bastogne–Liège.

References

External links
 

1927 births
1993 deaths
Belgian male cyclists
People from Sint-Katelijne-Waver
Cyclists from Antwerp Province